Christian Brothers may refer to:

 Christian Brothers (film), a 2011 Malayalam-language thriller film
 The Christian Brothers, a 1975 play by Australian writer Ron Blair
 "Christian Brothers", a song by Elliott Smith from his 1995 album Elliott Smith
 Congregation of Christian Brothers or Irish Christian Brothers, a Catholic lay order founded in Ireland in 1802
 De La Salle Brothers or French Christian Brothers, a Catholic lay order founded in France in 1680
 Lasallian educational institutions, often referred to as Christian Brother schools

See also
 Christian Brothers Academy (disambiguation)
 Christian Brothers College (disambiguation)
 Christian Brothers High School (disambiguation)
 List of Christian Brothers schools